Live in Hollywood may refer to one of the following albums:

Live in Hollywood (Linda Ronstadt album), 2019
Live in Hollywood (Warne Marsh album), 1979
Live in Hollywood (RBD album), 2006
Live in Hollywood (RBD video album), 2006
Live in Hollywood (The Doors album), 2002
CeCe Peniston (EP Live) by Peniston, in 2013 retitled as Live in Hollywood
Live in Hollywood by Marianne Faithfull